Rudolf Mauersberger (29 January 1889 – 22 February 1971) was a German choral conductor and composer. His younger brother Erhard was also a conductor and composer.

Career 

After positions in Aachen and Eisenach, he became director of the renowned Dresdner Kreuzchor in 1930, a position he held until his death. In May 1933, Mauersberger became a member of the Nazi Party; there are strong indications though that he tried to minimize the influence of the NS-Ideology and in particular of the Hitler-Jugend onto the choir. He refused to stage NS-songs with the choir, and continued to perform the works of banned composers such as Felix Mendelssohn Bartholdy and Günter Raphael, at least as late as 1938.

Probably his most famous work is the motet Wie liegt die Stadt so wüst (How desolate lies the city), written after the destruction of Dresden in February 1945. The text is taken from the Lamentations of Jeremiah, verses 1,1.4.9.13; 2,15; 5,17.20–21. The work is often seen as a bemoaning of the destroyed city, but given the biblical context, it can also apply to the whole of Germany and her people, the destruction of the country being punishment for its iniquities. Mauersberger's  also reflects the destruction. He wrote a Passion music after St Luke, Passionsmusik nach dem Lukasevangelium, and the Dresdner Te Deum.

Selected works 
Choral cycles for soloists and mixed choir a capella 
 Tag und Ewigkeit, 1943 
 Weihnachtszyklus der Kruzianer (Christmas Cycle of the Kreuzchor), 1944–1946, including "Kleiner Dresdner Weihnachtszyklus" (excerpts), 1951 (de)
 Chorzyklus Dresden (Choral Cycle Dresden), 1945–1950, finished 1955, including Wie liegt die Stadt so wüst (de)
 Erzgebirge, 1946–1954 
 Der kleine Jahreskreis, 1950 
Religious works 
 Christvesper mit Turmgesängen, 1932–1963 
 Christmette, 1936 
 Fangt euer Tagwerk fröhlich an, 5 kleine Spruchmotetten 1940, 1943 
 Ostermette, 1941 
 Dresdner Te Deum, 1944/45
 Passionsmusik nach dem Lukasevangelium, 1947 
 Dresdner Requiem, 1947/48 (de)
 Geistliche Sommermusik, 1948 
 Eine kleine Weihnachtskantate (Christmas cantata), 1948 
 Motette vom Frieden, 1953 
 Evangelische Messe, 1954 
 Gesänge für die Kreuzkapelle zu Mauersberg, 1954–1956 (de)
Secular works 
 Maiwärts, Frühlingsode (Ode for spring), 1917/18 
Pfeifen, 1942 
 Kritik des Herzens, 1958 
 Habt Ruh und Frieden, Gedächtnisgesang, 1943 
 Drei Jahreszeitengedichte, 1965/66 
Instrumental music 
 Piano trio in C minor, 1913/14 
 Introduktion, Ciaconna und Choral E minor for organ, 1912–1914 
 Introduktion und Passacaglia A minor for organ, 1912–1914 
 Präludium und Doppelfuge (prelude and double fugue) D minor for organ, 1912–1914 
 Freie Orgelwerke, 1914–1916 
 Symphony E minor ("Tragische"), 1914–1916

Recordings
with the Dresdner Kreuzchor:
 Bach: Mass in B minor
 Schütz: Geistliche Chormusik
 Schütz: Psalmen Davids

with the Kreuzchor and the Thomanerchor, conducted together with Erhard Mauersberger:
 Bach: Matthäuspassion

References

Further reading

1889 births
1971 deaths
People from Erzgebirgskreis
People from the Kingdom of Saxony
German Lutherans
Nazi Party members
Christian Democratic Union (East Germany) politicians
German classical composers
German male classical composers
Bach conductors
German choral conductors
German male conductors (music)
Classical composers of church music
Recipients of the National Prize of East Germany
Recipients of the Patriotic Order of Merit in gold
20th-century German conductors (music)
20th-century German male musicians